The Haut Commissariat au Plan (HCP) or Higher Planning Commission in Morocco is an independent government statistical institution. Established in 2003, HCP is the main source of economic, demographic and social statistical data.

Division 

HCP’s main departments and divisions are:

 Department of Statistics 
 Department of planning 
 Department of Forecasting
 Department of National Accounting
 National Center for Program Evaluation
 Centre for Demographic Studies and Research 
 Observatory for Household Living Conditions
 National Institute for Economic Analysis
 National Institute of Statistics and Applied Economics
 School of Information Sciences

See also
 1994 Moroccan census
 2004 Moroccan census
 2014 Moroccan census

References 

Government agencies of Morocco
National statistical services